Penrith Rugby Club, known as the Emus, is an Australian rugby union club based in Penrith, a western suburb of Sydney, New South Wales. The club was formed in 1965 as Nepean and renamed Penrith in 1981 and began playing in the Shute Shield in 1995 until their removal midway through the 2018 competition. Sydney Rugby Union chairman David Begg said the Emus had failed to 'meet the standards set for all clubs to compete at the premiership level'. The club was readmitted to the competition for the 2020 season before being dropped again ahead of the 2022 season.

Club information 
COMPETITION HISTORY:

1965: NSW Suburban Rugby Union
1966-1980: Sydney Rugby Union-2nd Division
1981-1983: Sydney Rugby Union-3rd Division
1984-1992: Sydney Rugby Union-2nd Division
1993-1994: NSW Suburban Rugby Union-1st Division
1995-2018: NSWRU Shute Shield
2020-2021: NSWRU Shute Shield
2022-Present: ACT John I Dent Cup

PREMIERSHIPS:

Sydney Rugby Union-3rd Division
1st Grade: 1981, 82, 83
2nd Grade: 1981, 82
3rd Grade: 1982
4th Grade: NIL
Colts (U20): NIL
Club Championship: 1983

NSW Suburban Rugby Union-1st Division
1st Grade (W.H. Kentwell Cup): NIL
2nd Grade (George Burke Memorial Cup): NIL
3rd Grade (H.W. Whiddon Cup): 1994
4th Grade (H.A. Judd Cup): 1993
5th Grade (Sutherland Cup): NIL
Colts (U21) (Barbour Cup): NIL
Club Championship (Bruce Graham Shield): NIL

References

External links

Rugby union teams in New South Wales
Rugby union teams in Sydney
Rugby clubs established in 1965
1965 establishments in Australia
Penrith, New South Wales